Ancistrocarphus keilii is a rare species of flowering plant known by the common name Santa Ynez groundstar. It is endemic to Santa Barbara County, California, where it is known only from three populations in the Santa Ynez River drainage. There are perhaps 180 individuals left in existence. The plant was described to science in 2004.

Ancistrocarphus keilii grows in sandy soils in chaparral habitat adjacent to oak woodlands. The plant is considered to be vulnerable to extinction because it is rare, its populations are located in habitat that is likely to be disturbed or developed, and because it apparently has no effective method of biological dispersal.

Description
This is a petite and easily overlooked annual herb. There is no stem, just a small rosette of spoon-shaped leaves no more than 1 or 2 centimeters long. The leaf blades are borne on petioles with thin, expanded bases that surround the inflorescence. There is one flower head 2 or 3 millimeters long which is hidden amidst the leaf bases. The tiny achene generally germinates directly next to its parent, so that the plants become a carpetlike layer.

The species is named in honor of California botanist David John Keil (1946-).

References

External links
Jepson Manual Treatment
Calphotos Photo gallery, University of California

Gnaphalieae
Endemic flora of California
Natural history of the California chaparral and woodlands
Natural history of Santa Barbara County, California
Santa Ynez Mountains
Plants described in 2004